Angelica wine is a historic sweet fortified wine usually from California made typically from the Mission grape. It is often served as a dessert wine. 

Some varieties consist of the unfermented grape juice fortified with brandy or clear spirit immediately after pressing. Others are made like port, where the only partially fermented wine, still retaining a large amount of sugar, is infused with brandy. The relatively high alcohol of the brandy arrests the fermentation, leaving a fortified wine high in alcohol and high in residual sugar (usually about 10 to 15%). It is typically made from 50% Mission wine and 50% Mission brandy.

Angelica dates to the Mission period in California and its name is thought to be taken from the city of Los Angeles. It was produced by the Franciscan missionaries and is one of the first wines made in the state. Several California producers continue to produce Mission-based Angelica.

The wine is sometimes made in a simple style and is inexpensive. Some is made with great care from ancient vines and can be quite expensive. Bottles of Angelica as old as 1870 can still be found and show great distinction.

Further reading
The Grocer's Encyclopedia, by Artemas Ward

References

California wine
Fortified wine
Dessert wine
Spanish missions in California